Tommy Robredo won in the final 1–6, 7–5, 7–6 (7–2) against Albert Portas.

Seeds
A champion seed is indicated in bold text while text in italics indicates the round in which that seed was eliminated.

  Dominik Hrbatý (first round)
  Albert Portas (final)
  Tommy Robredo (champion)
  Cédric Pioline (first round)
  Mikhail Youzhny (second round)
  Christophe Rochus (first round)
  Andrei Stoliarov (first round)
  Olivier Rochus (first round)

Draw

References
 2001 Idea Prokom Open Draw

Men's Singles
Singles